Nephotettix is a genus of planthoppers  in the subfamily Deltocephalinae and tribe Chiasmini.  Species are mostly found in Asia, although two are from Africa.

Known as 'green leafhoppers' of paddy/rice, Nephotettix cincticeps and N. virescens appear to be the most important Asian pest species in this genus: as vectors of viruses, such as tungro disease in rice.

Species
Based on the Global Biodiversity Information Facility listing, this genus includes:
 Nephotettix afer Ghauri, 1968 (southern Africa)
 Nephotettix cincticeps Uhler, 1896 (synonyms: various subspp. of Nephotettix apicalis and N. bipunctatus)
 Nephotettix malayanus Ishihara & Kawase, 1968
 Nephotettix modulatus Melichar, 1912
 Nephotettix nigropictus (Stål, 1870) (synonym N.  nigropicta)
 N. nigropictus yapicola Linnavuori
 Nephotettix parvus Ishihara & Kawase, 1968
 Nephotettix plebeius Kirkaldy, 1906
 Nephotettix sympatricus Ghauri, 1971
 Nephotettix virescens (Distant, 1908) (synonyms: N. bipunctatus (Fabricius), N. impicticeps Ishihara, N. oryzii Mahmood & Aziz, N. yapicola Linnavuori)

References

External links
 
 

Auchenorrhyncha genera
Deltocephalinae